Ponomaryovo is a rural locality (a village) in Oktyabrskoye Rural Settlement, Vyaznikovsky District, Vladimir Oblast, Russia. The population was 15 as of 2010.

Geography 
Ponomaryovo is located 25 km southwest of Vyazniki (the district's administrative centre) by road. Pozdnyakovo is the nearest rural locality.

References 

Rural localities in Vyaznikovsky District